Agapanthia auliensis is a species of beetle in the family Cerambycidae. It was described by Maurice Pic in 1907.

References

auliensis
Beetles described in 1907